John Simpson Hastings (June 30, 1898 – February 7, 1977) was a United States circuit judge of the United States Court of Appeals for the Seventh Circuit.

Early life and education
John Simpson Hastings was born June 30, 1898, in Washington, Indiana. He graduated from Washington High School in 1916 and attended Indiana University from 1916 to 1918. He left IU to attend the United States Military Academy at West Point, New York. Hastings received a Bachelor of Science degree from West Point in 1920 and a commission as a second lieutenant in the United States Army Field Artillery. He reached the rank of first lieutenant before resigning from the army in 1921. After leaving the army, Hastings entered the Indiana University School of Law. In his senior year of law school, he won the Gamma Eta Gamma award for the highest scholastic average. Hastings graduated with a LL.B. in 1924. He practiced law in his hometown of Washington from 1924 to 1957.

Indiana University
Hastings served as president of the Indiana University Alumni Association from 1933-1935. On June 17, 1935, Hastings and Uz McMurtrie, representing the IU Alumni Council, appeared before the IU Board of Trustees to propose the establishment of the Indiana University Foundation. Hastings was a charter member of the IU Foundation and served on its board of directors from 1936 to 1969. He was Vice President of the IU Foundation from 1951-1969. After his resignation, he was made an honorary director for life.

Hastings was an Indiana University trustee from 1936 through 1959. He was President of the IU Board of Trustees from 1950 to 1959. Hastings also served on IU President John Ryan's Ad Hoc Committee of Special Consultants on Legal Education at Indiana University in 1975. He was a member of the Board of Visitors for the IU School of Law from 1970 to 1977.

Federal judicial service
Hastings was nominated by President Dwight D. Eisenhower on March 14, 1957, to a seat on the United States Court of Appeals for the Seventh Circuit vacated by Judge James Earl Major. He was confirmed by the United States Senate on August 22, 1957, and received his commission on August 26, 1957. He served as Chief Judge and as a member of the Judicial Conference of the United States from  1959 to 1968. Hastings retired on February 1, 1969, but continued as an active senior judge. In January 1972, Chief Justice Warren E. Burger of the Supreme Court named Hastings as Circuit Judge of the Temporary Emergency Court of Appeals of the United States. His judicial service was terminated on February 7, 1977, due to his death.

Death
Hastings died at Northwestern Memorial Hospital in Chicago on February 7, 1977, at age 78. He was survived by his wife, Mary Esther Smiley Hastings.

Honors
Hastings received honorary LL.D.s from Indiana University in 1959 and Northwestern University in 1961. He received Order of the Coif from Phi Beta Kappa in 1968. Hastings received a law award from the Lincoln Academy of Illinois in 1967. He was also awarded membership into the Indiana Academy in 1972.

References

Sources
Archives Online at Indiana University: John Simpson Hastings papers, 1933-1977, bulk 1959-1976
 

1898 births
1977 deaths
People from Washington, Indiana
Indiana University Maurer School of Law alumni
United States Military Academy alumni
Judges of the United States Court of Appeals for the Seventh Circuit
United States court of appeals judges appointed by Dwight D. Eisenhower
20th-century American judges
United States Army officers